This glossary defines terms that are used in the document "Defining Video Quality Requirements: A Guide for Public Safety", developed by the Video Quality in Public Safety (VQIPS) Working Group.  It contains terminology and explanations of concepts relevant to the video industry. The purpose of the glossary is to inform the reader of commonly used vocabulary terms in the video domain. This glossary was compiled from various industry sources.

A

B

C

D

E

F

G

H

I

J

K

L

M

N

O

P

R

S

T

U

V

Y

Z

See also
Glossary of broadcasting terms
Glossary of motion picture terms

Notes

References

Further reading 
 "ATI Telecom Glossary 2012" ATIS-0100523.2011 Copyright © Alliance for Telecommunications Industry Solutions, 2011
 List of broadcasting terms

Video
Video
Wikipedia glossaries using description lists